The Maoshan Pagoda, or also known as Jinguishan Pagoda, is a pagoda in Jincheng Township, Kinmen County, Taiwan. It is located on the west side of Kinmen old city and the south of Maoshan, Shuitou Village.

History

Ming Dynasty
During the 14th century, pirate activities were growing around the shore of Ming Dynasty. Ming official who was stationed in Kinmen established Maoshan Pagoda and other two pagodas as lighthouses to protect Kinmen and guide ships.

Republic of China
In 1958, the pagoda formed a barrier against the People's Liberation Army during the 823 Artillery War. In 2004, the pagoda was reconstructed by the government based on its historical records and remains.

Architecture
The pagoda stands at a height of 11.25 meters.

See also
 Longfeng Temple, Jinsha Township
 Wentai Pagoda

References

Buildings and structures in Kinmen County
Jincheng Township
Pagodas in Taiwan
Tourist attractions in Kinmen County